Anton Joseph Cermak (May 9, 1873 – March 6, 1933) was an American politician who served as the 44th mayor of Chicago, Illinois, from April 7, 1931, until his death on March 6, 1933. He was killed by an assassin, whose likely target was President Franklin D. Roosevelt, but the assassin shot Cermak instead after a bystander hit the assassin with a purse.

Life
Anton Joseph Cermak was born to a mining family in Kladno, Austria-Hungary (now in the Czech Republic), the son of Antonín Čermák and Kateřina née Frank(ová).

He emigrated with his parents to the United States in 1874, and  grew up in the town of Braidwood, Illinois, where he was educated before beginning to work full time while still a teenager. He followed his father into coal mining, and labored at mines in Will and Grundy counties. After moving to Chicago at age 16, Cermak worked as a tow boy for the horse-drawn streetcar line, and then tended horses in the stables of Chicago's Pilsen neighborhood. During the early years of his working life, Cermak supplemented his education with evening high school and business college classes.

After saving enough money to buy his own horse and cart, he went into business selling firewood, and he subsequently expanded his venture into a haulage business. As he became more politically active, Cermak served in municipal government jobs, including as a clerk in the city police court, and as a bailiff for the Municipal Court of Chicago. As his political fortunes began to rise, Cermak was able to avail himself of other business opportunities, including interests in real estate, insurance, and banking.

He began his political career as a Democratic Party precinct captain, and in 1902, he was elected to the Illinois House of Representatives. Seven years later, he became alderman of the 12th Ward (serving two terms: one from 1909 through 1912, and another from 1919 through 1922). Cermak was elected President of the Cook County Board of Commissioners in 1922, chairman of the Cook County Democratic Party in 1928, and mayor of Chicago in 1931.

In 1928, he ran for the United States Senate, but was defeated by Republican Otis F. Glenn, after Cermak received only 46% of the vote.

Mayor of Chicago (1931–1933)

Cermak's mayoral victory came in the wake of the Great Depression, the deep resentment many Chicagoans had of Prohibition, and the increasing violence resulting from organized crime's control of Chicago—typified by the St. Valentine's Day Massacre.

The many ethnic groups, such as Czechs, Poles, Ukrainians, Jews, Italians, and African Americans, who began to settle in Chicago in the early 1900s were mostly detached from the political system, due in part to a lack of organization, which led to underrepresentation in the City Council. As an immigrant himself, Cermak recognized Chicago’s relatively new immigrants as a significant population of disenfranchised voters, which had the potential to be a large power base for Cermak and his local Democratic organization.

Before Cermak, the Democratic party in Cook County was run by Irish Americans. The Irish first became successful in politics since they spoke English, and because, coming from an island on the edge of Europe, they had few ancestral enemies. As the old saying went: “A Lithuanian won’t vote for a Pole, and a Pole won’t vote for a Lithuanian. A German won’t vote for either of them. But all three will vote for a turkey—an Irishman.” As Cermak climbed the local political ladder, the resentment of the party leadership grew. When the bosses rejected his bid to become the mayoral candidate, Cermak swore revenge. He formed his political army from the non-Irish elements, and even persuaded the black politician, William L. Dawson, to switch from the Republican to the Democratic Party.

Dawson later became a U.S. Representative (from the 1st District), and soon the most powerful black politician in Illinois. Cermak’s political and organizational skills helped create one of the most influential political organizations of his day. With support from Franklin D. Roosevelt on the national level, Cermak gradually wooed members of Chicago’s growing black community into the Democratic fold. Walter Wright, the superintendent of parks and aviation for the city of Chicago, aided Cermak in stepping into office.

When Cermak challenged the incumbent, William “Big Bill” Hale Thompson, in the 1931 mayor's race, Thompson, who represented Chicago's existing Irish-dominated power structure, responded with an ethnic slur filled ditty that ridiculed his teamster past (pushing a pushcart):

I won’t take a back seat to that Bohunk, Chairmock, Chermack, or whatever his name is.
Tony, Tony, where’s your pushcart at?
Can you picture a World’s Fair mayor with a name like that?

Cermak replied, “He doesn’t like my name… it’s true I didn’t come over on the Mayflower, but I came over as soon as I could.” It was a sentiment to which ethnic Chicagoans could relate, and Thompson’s prejudicial insults largely backfired.

Thompson’s reputation as a buffoon, many voters’ disgust with the corruption of his political machine, and his inability or unwillingness to clean up organized crime in Chicago were cited as major factors in Cermak capturing 58% of the vote in the mayoral election on April 6, 1931. Cermak’s victory finished Thompson as a political power, and largely ended the Republican Party's influence in Chicago; indeed, all the mayors of Chicago since 1931 have been members of the Democratic Party. For nearly his entire administration, Cermak had to deal with a major tax revolt. From 1931 to 1933, the Association of Real Estate Taxpayers mounted a “tax strike.”

At its height, the association, which was headed by John M. Pratt and James E. Bistor, had over 30,000 members. Much to Cermak’s dismay, it successfully slowed down the collection of real estate taxes through litigation and the promotion of the refusal to pay. In the meantime, the city found it difficult to pay teachers and maintain services. Cermak had to meet President-elect Roosevelt to “mend fences,” and to request money to fund essential city services.

A 1993 survey of historians, political scientists and urban experts conducted by Melvin G. Holli of the University of Illinois at Chicago ranked Cermak as the twenty-fifth-best American big-city mayor to have served between the years 1820 and 1993.

Death

On February 15, 1933, while shaking hands with President-elect Franklin D. Roosevelt at Bayfront Park in Miami, Florida, Cermak was shot in the lung and mortally wounded by Giuseppe Zangara, who was attempting to assassinate Roosevelt. At the critical moment, Lillian Cross, a woman standing near Zangara, hit Zangara's arm with her purse, and spoiled his aim. In addition to Cermak, Zangara hit four other people: Margaret Kruis, 21, of Newark, NJ, shot through the hand; Russell Caldwell, 22, of Miami, hit squarely in the forehead by a spent bullet, which embedded itself under the skin; Mabel Gill of Miami, shot in the abdomen; and William Sinnott, a New York police detective, who received a glancing blow to the forehead and scalp. All four of those injuries were minor.

Once at the hospital, Cermak reportedly uttered the line that was engraved on his tomb, saying to Roosevelt, “I’m glad it was me, not you.” The Chicago Tribune reported the quote without attributing it to a witness, and most scholars doubt that it was ever said.

Zangara told the police that he hated rich and powerful people, but not Roosevelt personally. Later, rumors circulated that Cermak, not Roosevelt, had been the intended target, as his promise to clean up Chicago’s rampant lawlessness posed a threat to Al Capone and the Chicago organized crime syndicate. One of the first people to suggest the organized crime theory was reporter Walter Winchell, who happened to be in Miami the evening of the shooting.  According to Roosevelt biographer Jean Edward Smith, there is no proof for this theory.

Long-time Chicago newsman Len O’Connor offers a different view of the events surrounding the mayor’s assassination. He has written that aldermen Paddy Bauler and Charlie Weber informed him that relations between Cermak and Roosevelt were strained, because Cermak fought Roosevelt’s nomination at the Democratic convention in Chicago.

Author Ronald Humble provides yet another perspective as to why Cermak was killed. In his book Frank Nitti: The True Story of Chicago’s Notorious Enforcer, Humble contends that Cermak was as corrupt as Thompson, and that the Chicago Outfit hired Zangara to kill Cermak in retaliation for Cermak’s attempt to murder Frank Nitti.

Cermak died at Jackson Memorial Hospital in Miami on March 6, partly due to his wounds. On March 30, however, his personal physician, Dr. Karl A. Meyer, revealed that the primary cause of Cermak’s death was ulcerative colitis, commenting, “The mayor would have recovered from the bullet wound had it not been for the complication of colitis. The autopsy disclosed the wound had healed ... the other complications were not directly due to the bullet wound.” Doubts were raised at the time and later concerning whether the bullet wound directly contributed to his death. A theory raised decades later contended that the bullet had actually caused damage to his colon which led to perforation which was undiagnosed by his doctors. It alleged that "but for [the] physicians' blunders" Cermak might have survived. This theory was refuted by a later medical analysis of the event.

Zangara was convicted of murder after Cermak’s death, and was executed in Florida's electric chair on March 20, 1933.

Cermak was interred in a mausoleum at the Bohemian National Cemetery in Chicago. The mayor’s death was followed by a struggle for succession both to his party chairmanship, and for the mayor's office.

A plaque honoring Cermak still lies at the site of the assassination in Miami’s Bayfront Park. It is inscribed with Cermak’s alleged words to Roosevelt after he was shot, “I’m glad it was me instead of you.” Following Cermak’s death, 22nd Street—a major east–west artery that traversed Chicago’s West Side, and the close-in suburbs of Cicero and Berwyn, areas with significant Czech populations—was renamed Cermak Road. In 1943, a Liberty ship, the SS A. J. Cermak was named in Cermak’s honor. It was scrapped in 1964.

Descendants
Cermak’s son-in-law, Otto Kerner Jr., served as the 33rd Governor of Illinois, and as a federal circuit judge.

His grandson, Frank J. Jirka, Jr., who was with him in Miami when he was assassinated, later became an Underwater Demolition Team officer in the United States Navy. Jirka was awarded a Silver Star and Purple Heart for his actions during the Battle of Iwo Jima; the wounds he suffered led to the amputation of both legs below the knee. After World War II, he became a physician, and in 1983, was elected president of the American Medical Association. Cermak’s great niece, Kajon Cermak, is a radio broadcaster. His daughter, Lillian, was married to Richey V. Graham, who served in the Illinois General Assembly.

In popular culture 
 A hastily-produced movie about Cermak, The Man Who Dared, was released within months of his death.
 There was a made-for-TV movie, The Gun of Zangara, about Cermak’s assassination. It was originally a two-part episode of The Untouchables, where it had the title “The Unhired Assassin.” Cermak had a major role in the story as an honest man, and was played by Robert Middleton.
 Cermak is mentioned in Stephen Sondheim’s play Assassins during the song “How I Saved Roosevelt.”
 Cermak and his rise to the mayoralty has also been mentioned in Jeffrey Archer’s novel Kane and Abel.
 Part of the episode “Objects in Motion” of the television series Babylon 5 is based on the circumstances of Cermak’s death.
 Cermak is referenced by Kelsey Grammer’s fictional Chicago mayor, Tom Kane, in several episodes of the Starz TV series Boss.
 In “Red Team III,” the seventh episode in the second season of HBO’s The Newsroom, Will McAvoy (Jeff Daniels) references Anton Cermak.
 The history-based crime novel True Detective, the first in Max Allan Collins’ Nathan Heller series, includes a fictionalized account of the Cermak slaying.
 In the first episode of the second season of F is for Family, an adult animated sitcom produced for Netflix, the fictional school of Anton Cermak Tech is mentioned during a broadcast.
 A fictional alternate universe version of Cermak is a main character in the alternate history short story Next Year in Prague by Barbara Newman. The timeline of the story diverges from reality on February 15, 1933, in which Zangara’s bullet misses Cermak as he was trying to shoot Roosevelt, meaning both survive the assassination attempt. Cermak continued serving as the Mayor of Chicago, and gets reelected several times, despite more attempted assassinations on him. Cermak fights a war against Chicago's gangsters at the height of the Mafia's power in the city, even personally taking part in police raids, despite the obvious danger in doing so. The evidence found at the raids meant that Crime boss Al Capone is found guilty on seven charges of murder, and is subsequently executed in 1938 (in real life, Capone was responsible for several murders, but police were unable to prove it beyond the reasonable doubt required by the law, and instead convicted him with proven tax evasion in 1931; he died of cardiac arrest in 1947). Because of the role Cermak played in the Capone trial, he becomes very popular nationally, and the “Cermak Amendment” is enacted in the 1940s, amending the Constitution to remove the Natural-born-citizen requirement for President and Vice-President, in order to allow Czech-born Cermak to run for those positions. Thanks to this, President Roosevelt decides to make Cermak his running mate instead of Harry S. Truman, and replaced Henry A. Wallace as Vice-President for the 1944 election. When Roosevelt dies in office in 1945 (as he did in real life), Cermak becomes President. As the Cold War takes shape in 1948, Cermak personally intervenes in the affairs of his birth country of Czechoslovakia to prevent its Communist takeover. After the Czechoslovak coup d'état by the Communist Party, Cermak writes a threatening letter to Joseph Stalin, which nearly starts World War III, but conflict is narrowly averted by a summit in Prague. Cermak publicly states that Stalin has agreed to withdraw from Czechoslovakia, which will now act as a neutral democracy—not part of any alliance. Secretly, Cermak also agreed to a trade-off, where in return for a democratic Czechoslovakia, the United States would withdraw from South Korea, and allow Communist North Korea to reunify Korea under its Communist government. This part of the deal was only discovered a week after it was signed when it was revealed by Cermak's opponents in Congress. As the agreement came into force, a major issue in the presidential election that year was whether it was ethical or not to pay for the freedom of one country (Czechoslovakia) in exchange for the occupation of another (Korea), with such arguments often leading to violence between supporters and opponents of the deal. Cermak barely gets re-elected, and it is implied that his second term will be much harder for him than his first.
 In The Untouchables TV series (1993–1994), Cermak is assassinated by Zangara—a crazy lone gunman targeting FDR—after Ness prevents the assassin they believe was sent by Capone. After the Untouchables return to Chicago, their further investigation reveals a probable third gunman, whose shot actually is responsible for Cermak's death, and was a Capone hitman. The first half of the next episode partly involves Ness’ Untouchables identifying the actual gunman (a Capone hitman named Charlie Ross), who goes into hiding after a raid by the Untouchables. As the Untouchables arrange to bring him in for testimony, he is gunned down, thereby forever silencing the truth about the mob killing the mayor.

See also

 List of assassinated American politicians

Notes

Citations

General sources 
 Beito, David T. Taxpayers in Revolt: Tax Resistance During the Great Depression. Chapel Hill: University of North Carolina Press, 1989. .

External links

 Cermak's tomb at Bohemian National Cemetery
 

|-

|-

1873 births
1933 deaths
1933 murders in the United States
American people of Bohemian descent
Assassinated American politicians
Assassinated mayors
Attempted assassinations of presidents of the United States
Austro-Hungarian emigrants to the United States
Burials at Bohemian National Cemetery (Chicago)
Chicago City Council members
Deaths by firearm in Florida
Deaths from peritonitis
Mayors of Chicago
Democratic Party members of the Illinois House of Representatives
People from the Kingdom of Bohemia
People murdered in Florida
Male murder victims
Presidents of the Cook County Board of Commissioners
Assassinated American county and local politicians